The 2008 Copa del Rey Final was the 106th final of the Spanish cup competition, the Copa del Rey. The final was played at Vicente Calderón in Madrid, on 16 April 2008.

The match was won by Valencia, who beat Getafe 3–1, winning the tournament for the seventh time. It was a second defeat in the final in succession for Getafe, who also lost to Sevilla in 2007. These had been their only appearances in the event; by contrast it was Valencia's  16th final.

Road to the final

Match details

References

External links
RSSSF.com

2008
1
Valencia CF matches
Getafe CF matches